Tharp is a surname, and may refer to:

In literature and theater 
Kenneth Tharp (contemporary), English dance artist
Twyla Tharp (b. 1941), American dancer and choreographer

In music 
Aran Tharp (b. 1977), American avant-garde musician
Reynold Tharp (b. 1973), American composer

In politics and law 
John J. Tharp, Jr. (b. 1960), US District Judge in Illinois
William Tharp (1803–1865), American politician from Delaware; governor of Delaware 1847–51

In sports 
Taylor Tharp (b. 1984), American professional football player

In business 
Carol Baker Tharp (1952–2007), American executive director

Other 
Hale Tharp (1828–unknown), miner during the California Gold Rush
Lars Tharp (b. 1954), Danish-born British-based historian, lecturer and broadcaster
Marie Tharp (1920–2006), American geologist and oceanographer

See also
Tharpe
Thorp (disambiguation)